Choi Mi-seon (born 10 October 1968) is a South Korean athlete. She competed in the women's shot put at the 1988 Summer Olympics.

References

External links
 

1968 births
Living people
Athletes (track and field) at the 1988 Summer Olympics
South Korean female shot putters
Olympic athletes of South Korea
Place of birth missing (living people)